Secrets for Sale (拍·卖）is a Singapore television drama series, produced by Wawa Pictures. It is Channel U's blockbuster of the year for 2011 and debuted on 14 March 2011. It is aired from Monday to Friday at 10:00pm. It has received much overwhelming response and raves from the viewers since its debut. The viewership reached 1,150,000, making it the most popular drama of the year 2011.

Plot
Secrets for Sale is a drama series revolving around a group of private investigators exposing the darkest secrets of individuals across the society. An ex-cop (Jesseca Liu) inherits a private detective agency from her sister and husband after they vanish without a trace. The technologically challenged lass then teams up with a sleazy debt-ridden photographer (Christopher Lee) to solve the mystery. Can they break the case without killing each other first?

Cast

Music
The theme song of Secrets For Sale is 《缠斗》 by Taiwanese singer Anthony Neely in the album <Lesson One>. The side track 《散场的拥抱》 is also by Anthony.

Overseas broadcast

Star Awards 2012 nominations

Asian Television Awards
Secrets For Sale were highly commended alongside Breakout for Best Drama Screenplay in the 2011 Asian Television Awards.

Star Awards 2012 Nominations
 Secrets For Sale was nominated for the Best Drama Series, but the award goes to On the Fringe 2011.
 The theme song 缠斗 by Anthony Neely was nominated for the Best Drama Theme Song award, but the award goes to Devotion's theme song.

References

2011 Singaporean television series debuts
2011 Singaporean television series endings
Singapore Chinese dramas
Channel U (Singapore) original programming